Keyano College is a post-secondary college located in Fort McMurray, Alberta, Canada. It offers specialized training to more than 2,100 full-time students and over 4,000 part-time students. The main Clearwater Campus is located in downtown Fort McMurray with the Suncor Energy Industrial Campus located in the Gregoire Industrial Park and a new campus in Fort Chipewyan. Outreach campuses are located in Anzac, and Fort McKay. The college is also a member of the Alberta Rural Development Network.

History
Keyano College opened in Fort McMurray in 1965 as the Alberta Vocational Centre (AVC).  The official opening ceremonies were held on January 26, 1966.  In 1975 the college was reopened under its current name, "Keyano", which is a Cree word which, roughly translated, means, "Sharing". The college's slogan was further adapted from that to be "Yours, Mine and Ours".

In 1978 Keyano College went public and became a community college when the province appointed a Board of Governors to serve as the decision-making body for the institution.

Keyano College has grown to become a modern series of buildings on many campuses.

Programs offered
Students can choose from certificate and diploma programs in a wide variety of areas, such as aboriginal entrepreneurship, business administration, college & career preparation, childhood studies, Bachelor of Education, EMT, environmental technology, office administration, practical nurse, human resources management, social work, and university studies.

A number of trades programs are also offered, such as heavy equipment technician and power and process engineering.
There are one- and two-year university transfer programs in a variety of disciplines with collaborative degrees in nursing and elementary education. Apprenticeship programs are also offered in electrician, heavy equipment technician, millwright, steamfitter/pipefitter, and welding. To make entering the workforce an easier process, Keyano offers pre-employment programs as an alternative to traditional apprenticeship training. First-rate technology is also used, including a new oilsands power & process engineering laboratory. This facility was funded in part by industry leaders.

Keyano also has an active Language Instruction for Newcomers to Canada (LINC) Program, which is funded by Immigration, Refugees, and Citizenship Canada, and that offers English language instruction to newcomers to Canada. The program numbers over 125 students, who represent more than 20 nations.

Scholarships and bursaries
Each Fall, Keyano hosts a Student Awards ceremony where sponsors give out their awards to deserving students. In November 2019, over $350,000 was awarded to 235 students.

Student life
Keyano's own theatre offers concerts (like Jann Arden, George Canyon, and Ron James) and plays (Calendar Girls, Mamma Mia!) as well as lectures and guest speakers (most recent being CTV's Seamus O’Regan and Alan Doyle of Great Big Sea).

Athletics
Sports teams include: basketball, volleyball, soccer, cheer, cricket and futsal.

See also
Education in Alberta

References

All facts, unless otherwise stated, are from Keyano College's web site:
Keyano College
Advanced education and Technology - Institutional Mandates

External links

Keyano College
Programs @ Keyano College

Buildings and structures in Fort McMurray
Colleges in Alberta
Vocational education in Canada
Educational institutions established in 1965
1965 establishments in Alberta